Pierre-Lambert Goossens (18 July 1827 – 25 January 1906) was a Belgian Cardinal of the Roman Catholic Church. He served as Archbishop of Mechelen from 1884 until his death, and was elevated to the cardinalate in 1889.

Biography
Pierre-Lambert Goossens was born in Perk, near Vilvoorde, and ordained to the priesthood on 21 December 1850. He then taught pedagogy at the seminary in Mechelen until 1858, also being named vice-pastor of its cathedral and private secretary to the Archbishop in 1856. After becoming an honorary canon in 1860, Goossens was made vicar general in 1878, and later a Domestic Prelate of His Holiness on 20 August 1880.

On 1 June 1883, Goossens was appointed Coadjutor Bishop of Namur and Titular Bishop of Abdera. He received his episcopal consecration on the following 24 June from Bishop Jean Faict, with Bishops Victor Doutreloux and by Victor van den Branden de Reeth serving as co-consecrators. Goossens succeeded Victor-Auguste-Isidore Dechamps as Bishop of Namur on 16 July 1883, and was later named Archbishop of Mechelen and thus Primate of the Belgian Church on 24 March 1884.

Pope Leo XIII created him Cardinal Priest of Santa Croce in Gerusalemme in the consistory of 24 May 1889. Goossens was one of the cardinal electors in the 1903 papal conclave that selected Pope Pius X.

In 1895 he ordained Amadeus de Bie as Abbot of Bornem Abbey. He died in Mechelen, at age 78, and is buried in his native Perk.

Honours 
 1885: Commander in the Order of Leopold.
 1900: Grand Cordon in the Order of Leopold.

See also
 Archbishopric of Mechelen-Brussels

References

External links
Cardinals of the Holy Roman Church
Catholic-Hierarchy 

1827 births
1906 deaths
19th-century Roman Catholic archbishops in Belgium
20th-century Roman Catholic archbishops in Belgium
Belgian cardinals
Cardinals created by Pope Leo XIII
People from Steenokkerzeel
Roman Catholic archbishops of Mechelen-Brussels
Bishops of Namur
Belgian Roman Catholic archbishops